Maliniak may refer to:

Places
 Maliniak, Ostróda County, a village in northern Poland
 Maliniak, Szczytno County, a village in northern Poland

Other
 Maliniak, Polish mead flavored with raspberry juice
 Arie Maliniak (born 1949), Israeli basketball player, coach and journalist